Felaniella is a genus of bivalves belonging to the family Ungulinidae.

The genus has cosmopolitan distribution.

Species:

Felaniella candeana 
Felaniella crebristriata 
Felaniella cuneata 
Felaniella dolabrata 
Felaniella parilis 
Felaniella sericata 
Felaniella sowerbyi 
Felaniella subradiata 
Felaniella usta 
Felaniella vilardeboaena

References

Ungulinidae
Bivalve genera